This is a list of candidates of the 1930 South Australian state election. The conservative Liberal Federation and Country Party, which had run a combined ticket known as the "Pact" in 1927, ran separately in 1930.

Retiring MPs

Liberal Federation

 Edward Coles (Flinders) – retired
 Francis Jettner (Burra Burra) – retired
 James McLachlan (Wooroora) – retired
 Henry Tossell (Yorke Peninsula) – retired

Thomas Thompson, the Independent Protestant Labor MHA for Port Adelaide, unsuccessfully attempted to switch to the Legislative Council at this election, contesting Central District No. 1.

Legislative Assembly

Sitting members are shown in bold text. Successful candidates are marked with an asterisk.

Legislative Council

References

1927 elections in Australia
Candidates for South Australian state elections
1930s in South Australia